Syed Muhammad Ibrahim is a Bangladeshi politician and retired Major General of the Bangladesh Army. He is the founder of Bangladesh Kallyan Party. He was awarded Bir Protik, the fourth highest gallantry award for military personnel in Bangladesh for his bravery during the Bangladesh Liberation war.

Career 
Ibrahim joined the Pakistan Military Academy in January 1970 and he was the fourth Bengali who was awarded by highest gallantry award sword of honour and commissioned in the East Bengal Regiment of Pakistan Army's Infantry Corps. He has assessed the top cadet of his class while being commissioned, in Sep 1970. As an officer of the 2nd East Bengal Regiment, he joined the Bangladesh Liberation War and fought for the entire period from 26 March 1971 to 16 December 1971. He was decorated with the gallantry award Bir Protik. Following the 2005 bombing by Jammatul Mujahideen Bangladesh, he was consulted by Bangladesh Nationalist Party government minister Amir Khasru Mahmud Chowdhury. He gave the opinion that JMB was not strong and the bombings were retaliation against the government.

Later Ibrahim became the chairman of a non-political voluntary organization called Moulana Bhasani Foundation. In December 2007 during the 2006–08 Bangladeshi political crisis, he founded a new political party named "Bangladesh Kallyan Party". His party joined the National United Front in 2008 led by Kamal Hossain. He was re-elected Chairman of the party on 5 December 2015. His party is a Member of the 20-Party Alliance led by Bangladesh Nationalist Party. On 16 December 2015, he was prevented by Special Security Forces from entering Bangabhaban, presidential palace, for Victory Day celebrations because his name was on an exclusionary list. This was the first time since 1980 he was not allowed to enter the celebrations at the presidential palace.

Ibrahim is a prolific and influential writer and speaker. He writes irregular but frequent columns for the major newspapers of Dhaka and the weekly magazine called PROBE.
 His party secretary, MM Aminur Rahman, disappeared on 27 August 2017 from Dhaka.

References

Bangladesh Army generals
1949 births
People from Hathazari Upazila
Bangladeshi politicians
Bangladeshi male writers
Living people
Faujdarhat Cadet College alumni
Recipients of the Bir Protik
Mukti Bahini personnel
Bangladeshi people of Arab descent